Riverside is an unincorporated community in Warren County, Kentucky, United States.

History
A post office called Riverside was established in 1888, and remained in operation until 1988. The name is a bit of a misnomer, as the Green River lies about one mile away from the town site.

In popular culture
Riverside and other towns such as Muldraugh, West Point, Kentucky, and Rosewood, Kentucky are the main setting of the open world survival horror game Project Zomboid.

References

Unincorporated communities in Warren County, Kentucky
Unincorporated communities in Kentucky